is a passenger railway station  located in Kita-ku Kobe, Hyōgo Prefecture, Japan. It is operated by the private transportation company, Kobe Electric Railway (Shintetsu).

Lines

Station layout
The station consists of two ground-level unnumbered side platforms, connected to the station building by a level crossing. The effective length of the platform is 4 cars. There are ticket gates on the north and south sides of the inbound platform
and the ticket gate on the south side is directly connected to the roundabout where buses and taxis arrive and depart.

Platforms

Adjacent stations

History

Passenger statistics
In fiscal 2019, the station was used by an average of 2,227 passengers daily

Surrounding area
There is a residential area on the west side of the station.
Kobe Municipal Komidori Elementary School

See also
List of railway stations in Japan

References

External links 

 Official home page 

Railway stations in Kobe
Railway stations in Japan opened in 1935